Sakyong-Pentong is a village in Mangan subdivision, North Sikkim district, Sikkim, India. The Ministry of Home Affairs has given it a geographical code of 260879.

References

Villages in Mangan district